Seba Al-Raai (born 25 June 1982) is a Syrian road cyclist. In 2011, she represented her nation at the 2011 UCI Road World Championships, placing 50th in the time trial, and the Tour de Feminin-O cenu Českého Švýcarska. She placed second in the road race at the 2014 Syrian National Championships.

Major results

2011
 10th Time trial, Asian Road Championships
 10th Golan I
2012
 8th Time trial, Asian Road Championships
2014
 2nd Road race, National Road Championships
2015
 National Road Championships
2nd Time trial
2nd Road race

References

External links

1982 births
Syrian female cyclists
Living people
Place of birth missing (living people)
Cyclists at the 2010 Asian Games
Cyclists at the 2014 Asian Games
Asian Games competitors for Syria